Eduard Willy Kurt Herbert von Dirksen (2 April 1882 – 19 December 1955) was a German diplomat (and from 1936 when he joined the party, specifically a Nazi diplomat) who was the last German ambassador to Britain before World War II.

Early life 
Dirksen was born into a recently-ennobled family whose members been Prussian civil servants for generations. His father, Willibald, was ennobled by Emperor Wilhelm I in 1887 and was granted a large estate together with Gröditzberg Castle (now Grodziec Castle) in Silesia as a reward for his services to the House of Hohenzollern. Willibald was a conservative nationalist who, after his retirement, held a seat in the Reichstag for the anti-Semitic Reichspartei and was described as a "fanatical admirer" of Wilhelm II, whom he visited regularly while in exile in the Netherlands. Dirksen's mother, Viktoria, came from a wealthy banking family and was once helpful to Adolf Hitler, which benefited Dirksen's career during Nazi Germany. In his memoirs, Dirksen boasted that he was "proud of my purely Germanic blood", as the Dirksen family had been ennobled in 1887 "before a whole batch of more or less Jew-tainted families were ennobled by the liberalistic Emperor Frederick III" in 1888.

As the Dirksens were parvenu nobility, unlike the ancient Junker families, they felt very insecure, and from the age of five onward, Herbert was forced to undergo a strict training regime to produce an "exemplary bearing" to allow him to be accepted by the Junkers. Dirsken had wanted to enter the exclusive Auswärtiges Amt (Foreign Office), but his father forced him to enter the Prussian civil service to prepare him to manage the family's estate in Silesia. As a university student at Heidelberg, the snobbish Dirksen joined the most exclusive fraternity whose membership were mostly aristocrats, which was a source of considerable pride to him. In 1905, he graduated with a Referendar (junior barrister) legal degree, and in 1907, he went on a tour around the world. After his graduation from university, Dirksen become a reserve officer with the Third Guard Uhlan regiment, based in Potsdam, which he always noted accepted only men from the aristocracy as officers. After working as an assistant judge, in 1910, Dirksen went on a four-month trip to Rhodesia, South Africa and German East Africa, where he was thinking about settling.

During World War I, Dirksen served in the German Army as a lieutenant and won the Iron Cross, Second Class. The American historian Carl Schorske described Dirksen as a "correct and proper aristocrat with the right connections" but also a man who was slavishly loyal to those who held power. Entering the Auswärtiges Amt in 1917, Dirksen served in the Hague (1917), Kiev (1918–1919) and in Warsaw (1920–1921).

Enemy of Poland 
In April 1920, Dirksen arrived in Warsaw to take up the post of chargé d'affaires. As the chargé d'affaires of the German embassy in Warsaw, Dirksen's relations with the Poles were extremely difficult. As Germany had no ambassador stationed at its embassy in Warsaw, Dirksen as the chargé d'affaires was in effect the ambassador to Poland. A measure of his antipathy to Poles can be seen in that the chapter of his 1950 memoirs dealing with his time in Warsaw, virtually all of Dirksen's comments about Poland and Poles are negative. In his memoirs, Dirksen wrote that he "shared the deep-seated feeling of superiority over the Pole inherent in the German". In May 1921, a plebiscite to decide the status of Silesia led to fighting between the Germans and Poles in Upper Silesia, both of whom were supported by their respective national governments, which caused strained relations between Berlin and Warsaw. As someone who had grown in Silesia, Dirksen's sympathies were completely with the Germans, which led him to insist that all of Silesia belonged to Germany and none of the parts of Silesia that voted to join Poland should be allowed to leave Germany. In October 1921, Dirksen left Warsaw to head up the Polish desk at the Auswärtiges Amt.

From May 1923 to February 1925, Dirksen served as German consul in the Free City of Danzig (modern Gdańsk, Poland). The fourteenth of Woodrow Wilson's Fourteen Points had announced that Poland should have its independence restored with secure access to the Baltic Sea. Taking up that point, the Poles had pressed at the Paris Peace Conference to annex Danzig, despite being mostly German, but instead, the Allies compromised by creating the Free City of Danzig, an independent city-state under the protection of the League of Nations in which Poland was granted certain special rights. Most people in Danzig wished to rejoin Germany, but the Poles were unwilling to see any change in Danzig's status. As German consul in Danzig, Dirksen often clashed with the Poles. As consul in Danzig, Dirksen played a prominent role in the "postbox war", a lengthy struggle over whatever the postboxes in Danzig should be painted red and white (the colours of Poland) or red, white and black (the colours of the right in Germany; red, black and yellow were the colors of the left in Germany). The selection of colours was a victory for the right-wing inclinations of the Danzig Senate. that governed the Free City of Danzig.

As the head of the Polish sub-desk within the Eastern Desk at the Auswärtiges Amt, Dirksen played a key role as an aide to Foreign Minister Gustav Stresemann in formulating German policy towards Poland, and in 1925 Dirksen was one of the leading advocates of using economic pressure to force Poland to return the Polish Corridor, Danzig and Upper Silesia to Germany. In early 1925, Dirksen wrote that the Polish Corridor and Upper Silesia would not be returned unless Poland was "weak", which led him to suggest that Germany and the "Anglo-Saxon powers" should follow a strategy of weakening the Polish economy to make Poland as militarily as weak as possible. Though the Auswärtiges Amt knew that there was no evidence that Poland was seeking war with Germany, the Wilhelmstrasse seized upon any rumors of Polish military movements towards the German frontier to portray Poland as an aggressive and expansionist state that was a menace to the peace of Europe, which was part of a broader public relations campaign waged in Europe and the United States to emphasise the theme of "Polish chauvinism and racial hatred". Dirksen had successfully argued that Germany's chances of regaining the Polish Corridor, Danzig and Upper Silesia would be better if world opinion was turned against Poland.

In a debate within Auswärtiges Amt, Carl Schubert, the State Secretary of the Auswärtiges Amt, argued against making loans to Germany conditional on the return of the lost territories and wrote that "only force" would force the Poles to return the Corridor and Upper Silesia. Schubert argued that since war with Poland was not yet practical, Germany should make loans to Poland under onerous conditions with high-interest rates to weaken Poland economically and thereby reduce the Polish military budget until Germany had rearmed, when Germany would take back the lost lands by war. Dirksen, however, also agreed that taking back the lands lost to Poland was "inconceivable without force", but argued that any sort of German loans to Poland would strengthen Poland and successfully maintained to Stresemann that Germany should not make any loans to Poland but should try to persuade other nations not to makes loans to Poland. Following Dirksen's recommendation, Stresemann ordered Friedrich Sthamer, the German ambassador to the Court of St. James's, to lobby Montagu Norman, the governor of the Bank of England, to ask him to pressure British banks into not making any loans to Poland. Sthamer was successful and reported to Berlin that Norman felt that the Treaty of Versailles was too harsh on Germany and was willing to support Germans efforts to revise Versailles by denying Poland loans.

In November 1925, Dirksen lamented that war with Poland was not possible because of the Treaty of Versailles, which had disarmed Germany and also because of the Franco-Polish Alliance. He said that if only Germany was rearmed, he would be all for launching a war against Poland at once. In a memorandum to Stresemann on 29 December 1925, Dirksen argued that Germany should annex all of Poland that had belonged to Germany in 1914, and he went on to vent his anti-Polish feelings by saying that he loathed all Poles. Stresmann wrote that Germany's chances of regaining the mostly-German city of Danzig would be higher if the Germans were willing to renounce their claim on the mostly-Polish city of Poznań. However, Dirksen was adamant that Posen, as he insisted on calling Poznań, had been German and would be so again and wrote that he did not feel that Germany should compromise in any way on its claims on the lands that once been German and that the frontier should be "rounded off" somewhere to the east. When Germany signed an arbitration treaty with Poland in 1926, Dirksen noted it meant only renouncing war with Poland was "for the time being" and that from the German view, the treaty was only for public relations to portray Germany as the peaceful partner in its relations with Poland.

Ambassador to Soviet Union 
In 1928, in a major promotion, Dirksen became the Ministerial Director of the East Division of the Foreign Office. On 28 January 1928, Dirksen attended a secret conference in Berlin with General Werner von Blomberg of the Truppenamt (the disguised General Staff), who was pressing for an invasion of Poland later that year. Dirksen argued against it because under the present international conditions, "a German-Polish war without the intervention of France or the other powers" was very unlikely. Dirksen had to advise Blomberg politely that his belief that the "spirit of Locarno" had improved Franco-German relations to such an extent that France would disregard its alliance with Poland if Germany invade it was an illusion.

Later in 1928, Foreign Minister Gustav Stresemann appointed Dirksen as Germany's Ambassador to the Soviet Union. In his memoirs, Dirksen wrote that the Soviet Union and Germany "shared the same fate": "Both had been vanquished in the war, both were being treated as outcasts by the Allied powers. Both felt resentment or enmity to their new neighbor Poland...Both were convinced that a give-and-take was mutually adventurous". However, Dirksen's views towards the Soviets were entirely pragmatic, as he went on to write that as a German and therefore a "civilized European", he felt only "contempt and abhorrence" towards communism and Russians. Dirksen supported Soviet efforts to help Germany break the terms of the Treaty of Versailles by developing weapons that Versailles had forbidden. Germany was to have such as tanks and aircraft, but he wanted German-Soviet military co-operation kept within its "proper limits". Since 1926, when the secret German-Soviet co-operation had become public knowledge following an exposé by The Manchester Guardian, the subject was a contentious one that had strained relations with France, which did not appreciate Germany breaking Versailles to develop forbidden weapons that would one day be used against it. Dirksen wanted the development of weapons in the Soviet Union to be handled by private German companies, working for the German state as much as possible. He feared that more revelations of German covert rearmament in the Soviet Union would cause too many difficulties with the French and hinder German efforts to have Versailles revised in its favour. From the German view, convincing France that Germany did not plan to start another world war was the key to the efforts to revise Versailles, and the fact that covert rearmament went on in the Soviet Union was not helpful to that campaign.

In his first speech in Moscow, in January 1929, Dirksen hailed the First Five-Year Plan and promised that Germany would do everything within its power to help the Soviets achieve the targets set out by the plan. Dirksen's relations with the Soviet Commissar for Foreign Affairs Georgy Chicherin were good, as Dirksen regarded Chicherin as pro-German. However, in 1930, when Maxim Litvinov replaced Chicherin, Dirksen made no secret of his dislike for Litvinov, who he charged was not really a follower of the Rapallo policy as Chicherin had been and also was a Jew. However, Dirksen argued in his memoirs that Litvinov's "anti-German" foreign policy inclinations had little influence on Stalin until 1933. In 1930–31, Dirksen negotiated a set of long-term credits for German businesses willing to sell machinery to the Soviet Union.

Despite's Dirksen's best efforts, German-Soviet relations did not develop as well as he hoped. Stresemann had often used the threat of Germany leaning east towards the Soviet Union as a way of getting concessions from Britain and France in his campaign to revise the Treaty of Versailles, and by the early 1930s, the Soviets had grown tired of the way in which the Germans used the threat of friendship with them for their own purposes. Moreover, by the early 1930s, the German Protestant middle classes were gripped with the fear that the German Communist Party would use the great unemployed masses made available by the Great Depression to stage a revolution. That caused much of the Protestant middle class in 1930 to start to vote for Nazi Party as the "party of order" to crush Marxism in Germany. In 1930, German Foreign Minister Julius Curtius warned Dirksen that as long as the Kremlin supported the Communists and as long as the German middle classes were obsessed with the fear of a communist revolution, which Curtius complained to be fanned by a hysterical campaign in the conservative German press, which vastly exaggerated the dangers of a communist revolution in Germany, the Reich had to keep a certain distance from the Soviet Union. Furthermore, Curtius noted that reports, which were true, that the Volga Germans suffered terribly because of the policies of forced collectivisation, imposed by the First Five-Year Plan, made it politically toxic for Germany to get too close to the Soviet Union. Dirksen still saw the Soviet Union as a "counterweight to the West" and urged Curtius not to turn back completely on the eastern pivot. He wrote that the main enemy was still Poland, and the Soviet Union was useful as a potential ally against Poland.

Hitler inspired a fierce maternal love in older, upper-class women, and in the 1920s, the "Hitler Mothers" emerged. They were older women, invariably from a well-off background, who pampered Hitler like a son and indulgined him with his favorite teas and chocolates. Dirksen's mother became a "Hitler Mother", launching a salon in which Hitler could meet all of her upper-class friends, and as well as her son, the German ambassador to the Soviet Union.

In early 1933, Dirksen was highly concerned that the anticommunist rhetoric of the Nazis might damage the relatively-good state of German-Soviet relations. In response, Prince Bernhard von Bülow, the State Secretary of the Auswärtiges Amt, sought to reassure Dirksen, "The National Socialists faced with responsibility are naturally different people and follow a policy other than that which they have previously proclaimed. That's always been so and is the same with all parties". Despite Bülow's assessment, German–Soviet relations started to decline, which left Dirksen very worried. Schorske called Dirksen "more than a loyal civil servant to the Nazis—a true if not ardent believer in Hitler". In May 1933, Dirksen had a meeting with Hitler in which he advised the Führer that he allowed relations with the Soviet Union to deteriorate to an unacceptable extent. Much to Dirksen's disappointment, Hitler informed him that he wished for an anti-Soviet understanding with Poland, which Dirksen protested implied recognition of the German–Polish border. The American historian Gerhard Weinberg described Dirksen as "a vain and pompous man who believed strongly in German co-operation with whatever country he was assigned to at the moment. His memory was sometimes poor, and his predictions frequently erroneous, but his observations on the situation in countries to which he was accredited were generally accurate...Like Neurath, Dirksen wanted to maintain tension with Poland to push for revision; Hitler preferred to wait until he was ready for wider schemes".

In his memoirs, Dirksen argued that there were two fractions in the Narkomindel, a "pro-French" fraction and a "pro-German" fraction, and it was not until Alfred Hugenberg's speech at the London Economic Conference in June 1933 that argued for Germany's right to colonise the Soviet Union that decided the issue for the pro-French. In August 1933, Dirksen was warned by Soviet Premier Vyacheslav Molotov that the state of German–Soviet relations would depend on how friendly the Germany chose to be towards the Soviet Union. In September 1933, a major crisis occurred in relations when journalists from Tass and Izvestia covering the Reichstag Fire trial in Leipzig were beaten up by the SA, and Hitler's response to Soviet note of protest against the assault of the Soviet journalists was an explicit threat to expel all Soviet journalists from the Reich if he ever received another note of protest again and an implicit threat to break off diplomatic relations with the Soviet Union . After being warned by the Auswärtiges Amt that trade with the Soviet Union provided Germany with raw materials needed for rearmament, Hitler took certain steps to reduce tension with the Soviet Union and did not break off diplomatic relations with Moscow, as he had considering, but at the same time, he made it clear that "a restoration of the German-Russian relationship would be impossible". As Dirksen continued to press Hitler for a rapprochement with the Soviet Union, Hitler decided to make him his new ambassador in Japan.

Ambassador to Japan 
In October 1933, he became the German Ambassador to Japan. On 18 October 1933, Dirksen had met Hitler and gained the impression that Hitler favoured the recognition of Manchukuo. Hitler had met Dirksen at Gröditzberg, in Silesia. Shortly after his arrival in Tokyo, Dirksen became involved with the efforts of a shady German businessman, drug dealer, Nazi Party member and friend of Hermann Göring, Ferdinand Heye, to become Special Trade Commissioner in Manchukuo. Dirksen's backing for Heye's schemes for a monopoly of Manchurian soybeanss and his advocacy of German recognition of Manchukuo brought him into conflict with his superior, Foreign Minister Baron Konstantin von Neurath, who preferred closer relations to China than to Japan. The question of recognition of Manchukuo was a litmus test for relations with both Japan and China. Against Dirksen's advocacy of recognizing Manchukuo, Neurath countered that Germany did far more trade with China than Manchukuo and so recognising Manchukuo would damage Germany's relations with China. On 18 December 1933, Dirksen was invited by the Japanese to visit Manchukuo to meet Emperor Puyi, an invitation that Dirksen wanted to take up, but the projected visit to Manchukuo was vetoed by Neurath. Instead, Dirksen sent his economic counselor to Manchukuo to meet Puyi, a meeting that was widely taken to indicate that Germany would soon recognise Manchukuo, which prompted furious protests from China.

After Dirksen's lobbying, Heye was appointed by Hitler to be his special trade commissioner in Manchukuo and given the authority to negotiate a trade agreement with Manchukuo, but Hitler in a communiqué denied that recognition of Manchukuo was imminent. Dirksen was informed by Neurath that German policy was not to recognise Manchukuo but to seek whatever trade advantages that might be gained. Despite the setback caused by the Heye affair, Dirksen continued his pro-Japanese line by declaring his sympathy for Japan's plans for the Greater East Asia Co-prosperity Sphere in return for which he expected German corporations to be allowed to play a prominent role. Supporters a pro-Chinese policy in the Auswärtiges Amt often countered Dirksen that Japan tended to exclude all foreign corporations from operating, which led them to doubt Dirksen's claims that Germany would profit from the Greater East Asia Co-prosperity Sphere. As Special Trade Commissioner, Heye told the Japanese that Germany would soon recognise Manchukuo and that he would be the first German ambassador in Hsinking (now Changchun, China). Heye wanted monopoly over not only soybeans but also all German business and investments in Manchukuo, which would be through a corporation run by himself and the industrialist Fritz Thyssen, who would charge German firms operating in Manchukuo a 10% fee on all profits that they made in Manchukuo. In addition, Heye, acting on his own, informed the Japanese that German recognition of Manchukuo would soon happen, a claim that strained German relations with both the Chinese, who were offended at the idea of German recognition for Manchukuo, and the Japanese, who were offended when German recognition did not come. The dispute was finally settled in February 1935 when Heye was finally disavowed by Hitler. Dirksen, a keen supporter of the "National Revolution" in Germany, often urged a German-Japanese rapprochement under the grounds that the Japanese plans for a "New Order in Asia" parallelled Germany's plans for a "New Order in Europe". In one dispatch to Berlin, Dirksen wrote: "It seems to be a psychological imperative and one dictated by reasons of state that these two great powers, who are combating the status quo and promoting the dynamism of living forces, should reach an agreement"" In 1936, Dirksen joined the Nazi Party and then always wore a party badge.

In 1935, Dirksen wrote up a private manuscript Zwischenbilanz (Intermediate Balance Sheet) recounting his life until then, which the American historian Robert Wistrich wrote showed him up to be "an egocentric, ambitious and embittered man" who complained that Hitler failed to appreciate sufficiently his loyal service. Dirksen was "outspokenly anti-Semitic", boosted that he never had any Jewish friends or joined any social clubs that admitted Jews, and said that liked the company of only Aryans. In April 1936, Dirksen finally made it to Changchun and concluded a Manchukuo–German trade agreement, which did not constitute de jure German recognition of Manchukuo, which the Reich continued to proclaim to remain part of China, but it was a de facto recognition of Manchukuo. In May 1936, Dirksen complained that the visit to China of General Walther von Reichenau, a well-known German general on the active list and known as one of Hitler's favorite generals, would offend Japan. At the same time, Dirksen emerged as one of the proponents of signing the Anti-Comintern Pact with Japan, which caused tensions with the Wehrmacht, which opposed the pact, and Neurath, not the least because plans for the pact had originated with Neurath's enemy, Joachim von Ribbentrop.

In his dispatches to Berlin, Dirksen consistently advocated Germany choosing Japan over China. In one dispatch, Dirksen argued the Kuomintang was too corrupt and disorganised to defeat the Chinese Communists, who would inevitably win the Chinese Civil War. In a conscious echo of the Wilhelmine fear of the Yellow Peril, Dirksen argued a Communist China would ally itself with the Soviet Union, and both would invade Europe. Happily for the Reich, Dirksen argued that there was a strong power in the form of Japan that had a "civilising mission" in China, eas willing and able to impose "order" on the hopeless Chinese and stop communism in Asia, which led him to the conclusion that Germany's Asian ally should be Japan, rather than China. After the Xian Incident of December 1936, which led to the formation of the "united front" of the Chinese Communist Party and the Kuomintang to resist any further Japanese encroachments on China, Dirksen reported to Berlin that Japan would never stand for it and predicted that the Japanese would strike China sometime in 1937.

In July 1937, the Second Sino-Japanese War began with the Marco Polo Incident. Dirksen reported that his Japanese hosts were extremely unhappy that Germany was the largest supplier of arms to China and that officers of the German military mission were training and, in some cases, leading the troops of the Chinese National Revolutionary Army to battle against the Imperial Japanese Army. In response to Dirksen's suggestion for the German military mission to be recalled from China, War Minister Field Marshal Werner von Blomberg proposed sending officers to the military mission in China. In late 1937, Dirksen become involved in attempts to mediate the end of the Sino-Japanese war. The war had caused a major bureaucratic power struggle within the German government: the Wehrmacht and the Auswärtiges Amt supported China, but the Dienststelle Ribbentrop, the SS and the Propaganda Ministry supported Japan. Dirksen, a pro-Japanese voice in the pro-Chinese Auswärtiges Amt, feared that his career might become marginalized, as Neurath was annoyed at Dirksen's support for the pro-Japanese Ribbentrop, which led Dirksen to suggest German mediation to end the war before the struggle between the pro-Japanese and pro-Chinese factions destroyed his career. Neurath feared that he might lose out in the power struggle with Ribbentrop and took up the suggestion of mediation as a way out. Hitler was indecisive about which side to back.

On 3 November 1937, Japanese Foreign Minister Kōki Hirota gave Dirksen a set of peace terms, which Dirksen sent to Neurath, who in his turn passed them along to Oskar Trautmann, the German ambassador in China, to be handed over to the Chinese. On 7 December 1937, Dirksen met with Hirota to report that Chiang Kai-shek was willing to make peace with Japan if China did not lose any more territory but was otherwise open to "peace talks on the basis of Japanese peace conditions". That posed a problem as ever since the war had begun in July 1937, Japan never stated any war aims other than to "chastise" the Chinese in the "holy war" waged for the sake of the god-emperor of Japan. The Japanese cabinet met to begin discussions of the peace terms that would be sought, but on 13 December 1937, the Japanese Army took the Chinese capital of Nanjing, which caused a euphoric mood in Tokyo. Japanese Prime Minister Prince Fumimaro Konoe decided, over the objections of the military, to escalate the war by seeking a "total victory" by making peace terms that he knew that Chiang could never accept. On 21 December 1937, Dirksen was presented with the Japanese peace terms to be presented to the Chinese, which were so extreme that even Dirksen remarked that they seemed to be written only to inspire their rejection by the Chinese. Dirksen took a very pro-Japanese and anti-Chinese line on the question of mediation and said that if Germany had to choose Japan over China if necessary. In a dispatch to the Wilhelmstrasse sent on 16 January 1938, Dirsken advised recalling the German military mission from China, ending arms sales to China, recognizing Manchukuo, prohiniting German investment in Kuomintang China and allowing German corporations to invest only in Japanese-occupied northern China. Noting that Ribbentrop was very pro-Japanese, Weinberg described Dirksen as the "one important member of the German diplomatic corps who agreed with Ribbentrop's China policy" who did much to ensure the final German recognition of Manchukuo in 1938.

Ambassador to Britain 
In early 1938, as part of the Blomberg-Fritsch affair, which saw Hitler tighten his control of the foreign policy and military, Neurath was removed as foreign minister and replaced by Ribbentrop, the ambassador to Britain. Besides forcing War Minister Werner von Blomberg to retire and removing the Army Commander Werner von Fritsch, the purge also removed several senior generals and diplomats. Dirksen took advantage of the situation by asking for a new post and was rewarded by being made the German ambassador to Britain and replaced Ribbentrop. Ribbentrop was endeared by Dirksen's support for his pro-Japanese line against Neurath, and besides, Dirksen had also managed to get along well with Heinrich Georg Stahmer, the chief of the Asian desk of the Dienststelle Ribbentrop. Moreover, Ribbentrop, wanted to promote General Eugen Ott, the German military attaché to Japan, as ambassador to force the Japanese to reciprocate, and thereby promote his very good friend, General Ōshima Hiroshi, the Japanese military attache to Germany, to be Japanese ambassador in Berlin. Ōshima was unique as being the only diplomat who actually liked Ribbentrop. On 4 February 1938, Hitler removed Neurath and also Count Ulrich von Hassell, who was German ambassador to Italy. For a time, it was widely believed that Dirksen would replace Hassell. Hitler's original plan was to move Franz von Papen, the German ambassador to Austria, to Spain and for Baron Eberhard von Stohrer, the German ambassador to Spain, to replace Ribbentrop in Britain.

However, the crisis that led to the Anschluss started before Papen could go to Burgos, the capital of Nationalist Spain, which required him to stay in Vienna. Hitler decided to keep Stohrer, who had proved to be able to get along well with the prickly General Francisco Franco in Burgos.

Count Hans Georg von Mackensen was demoted from State Secretary and appointed the German ambassador in Rome to replace Hassell, as he was Neurath's son-in-law, which made him stay on as State Secretary unacceptable to Ribbentrop. The German embassy in Britain was traditionally one of the most prestigious "grand embassies" operated by the Auswärtiges Amt, and his appointment was a major promotion for Dirksen. Unlike Ribbentrop who was an amateur diplomat who caused an endless number of gaffes during his time as ambassador to the Court of St. James's, Dirksen was a professional diplomat, and his appointment was very much welcomed in London, as the British regarded him as "a man of ability", unlike his predecessor.

In 1938 to 1939, he was German Ambassador to Britain and was appointed on 7 April 1938. Dirksen's relations with his superior, Foreign Minister Joachim von Ribbentrop, were very poor since he despised Ribbentrop as "an unwholesome, half-comical figure". Dirksen wrote in his 1950 memoirs Moskau, Tokyo, London, "During my term of office in London, Hitler never once took the trouble of following up on British offers of negotiations, even if only as a pretense. He never even answered".<ref>Weinberg Gerhard The Foreign Policy of Hitler's Germany: Starting World War II 1937–39', Chicago: University of Chicago Press, 1980 page 100.</ref> On 24 April 1938, Konrad Henlein, the leader of the Sudeten Heimatfront, which was supported by nearly all of the ethnic Germans in the Czechoslovak Parliament, had announced the Karlsbad Program at a party congress in Karlsbad, Czechoslovakia (now Karlovy Vary, Czech Republic). He demanded wide-ranging autonomy for the Sudetenland but also announced that he was still loyal to Czechoslovakia. The German government declared its support for the Karlsbad Programme, which had been secretly drafted in March at a meeting between Hitler and Henlein. That began the crisis in Central Europe that was to end by the Munich Agreement. The apparent moderation of Germany to demand only autonomy for the Sudetenland masked a sinister purpose to make it appear that Czechoslovakia was intransigent by refusing to grant autonomy for the Sudetenland, thus "forcing" Germany to invade. Henlein had promised to Hitler, "We must always demand so much that we can never be satisfied".

On 3 May 1938, Dirksen presented his accreditation to King George VI at Buckingham Palace and formally become the ambassador to Britain. After arriving in London, Dirksen told Viscount Astor that the speech of the British Prime Minister Neville Chamberlain after the Anschluss had "closed the door" on further Anglo-German talks for a resolution of European problems.

At his first meeting with Foreign Secretary, Lord Halifax, the subject was Sudetenland, and Dirksen assured Halifax that his government was "very anxious to keep things quiet in Czechoslovakia". Dirksen reported that Halifax had promised him that London and Paris would send a joint démarche to Prague urging the Czechoslovak President Edvard Beneš to make "concessions to the utmost limit" to the Sudeten Heimatfront, which had demanding autonomy. To show to the British the apparent reasonableness of the Sudeten Heimatfront, Dirksen had Henlein visit London starting on 12 May 1938 to meet various British politicians. Henlein denied working for Hitler and talked much about the Czechs were "oppressing" the ethnic Germans of the Sudetenland by forcing ethnic German children to attend schools in which they were taught in Czech. He insisted that he wanted only autonomy for the Sudetenland, but he admitted that if Prague refused to give in to all of eight demands of the Karlsbad Programme, Germany would definitely invade Czechoslovakia. At a luncheon hosted by the National Labour MP Harold Nicolson, Henlein met with various backbenchers from all parties, where he impressed them with his genial charm and mild-mannered ways. However, several of the MPs, like General Edward Spears, a Conservative, expressed some concern about the Karlsbad Programme since it declared that Prague should "harmonise" its foreign policy with Berlin's and that to be German was to be a National Socialist and so the Sudeten Heimatfront was to be the only legal party in the proposed autonomous Sudeten region.

Starting with the May Crisis in May 1938, Dirksen received warnings from the Foreign Office that Germany should not attempt to resolve the Sudetenland dispute by war. During the May crisis, Dirksen reported to Berlin that Britain did not want to go to war with Germany for the sake of Czechoslovakia but that it probably would go to war if Germany actually invaded Czechoslovakia. Dirsken reported that Halifax had told him that "in the event of a European conflict it was impossible to foresee whether Britain would not be drawn into it". Dirksen interpreted Halifax's statement as meaning that Britain probably would go to war if Germany attacked Czechoslovakia but noted that Halifax was unwilling to say so explicitly. At the same time, Dirksen was friendly with Joseph Kennedy Sr., the American ambassador to Britain. Dirksen often reported to Berlin the anti-Semitic remarks from Kennedy. At one point, Dirksen stated that Kennedy had told him, "it was not so much the fact that we [i.e., Germany] wanted to get rid of the Jews that was so harmful to us, but rather the loud clamour with which we accomplished this purpose".

On 8 June 1938, Dirksen was "frankly outspoken" on Ribbentrop in a meeting with Halifax by telling him that it was not true that Ribbentrop was an Anglophobe, and Dieksen understood that he failed as ambassador to Britain because "he had always felt obliged to keep one eye so much on the German end.... Nonetheless, he [Ribbentrop] still wished to establish closer relations between our two countries". Schorske wrote that everything that Dirksen had told Halifax about Ribbentrop had been lies, as Ribbentrop had emerged as the loudest anti-British voice in the German government and was convinced that sooner or later, Germany and Britain were destined to go to war again.

On the same day, Dirksen wrote to Berlin about the "psychotic" British people, who were willing to go to war with Germany: "the feeling... of being made a fool of in that affair [the Anschluss], grew up again, together with the determination not to allow unchallenged further alterations in the balance of power in Europe.... The attitude of the British people to the possibility of war has changed entirely since 1936. They are ready to fight should their government show them that this is necessary in order to put an end to the subjectively experienced threats and uncertainty". Dirksen ended his dispatch by warning that Chamberlain was committed to peace, but the "psychotic" British people might push him into war: "To regard the excitement of the last weeks as mere bluff might turn out to be a fatal error".

At the same time, Dirksen warned that the Chamberlain cabinet would "without the slightest doubt" go to war if Germany was seen to be threatening the balance of power in Europe, and he wrote that British appeasement was based on "the one condition that Germany would endeavor to achieve these ends by peaceful means". Dirksen ended his dispatch of 8 June with the predication that Chamberlain's cabinet was willing to see the Sudetenland join Germany if it was done after a referendum and "not interrupted by forcible measures on the part of Germany". In July 1938, Dirksen told Albert Forster, the Gauleiter of Danzig, who was visiting London, that Britain wanted a peaceful resolution of the Czechoslovak Crisis, but Dirksen believed that Britain would go to war if Germany attacked Czechoslovakia. On 11 July 1938, Dirksen met with Charles Corbin, the French ambassador to Britain.

Corbin reported to Paris that Dirksen had told him, "The British people... increasingly tend to envisage the destruction of an air war as the inevitable result of German aggression against Great Britain", which Dirksen saw as a positive development and told Corbin that there as long as the British believed that the Luftwaffe would destroy their cities, there was less chance of British "aggression" against Germany. Dirksen also advised Corbin that for that reason, France should not count on the British if it decided to honour the 1924 French-Czechoslovak Alliance, which committed France to go to war with any nation that attacked Czechoslovakia. However, Corbin also reported that Dirksen had complained to him that "public opinion is currently against Germany".

Later in July 1938, Dirksen was caught in the internal feuds of the Third Reich. Dirksen welcomed the secret visit to London of Captain Fritz Wiedemann, Hitler's personal adjutant, who were there to represent Hermann Göring, who wanted to arrange a visit to London to seek a peaceful solution to the Sudetenland dispute. Göring detested Ribbentrop and, as chief of the Four-Year Plan Organisation, felt that on economic grounds, that Germany was not ready for a general war in 1938, which led him to oppose Hitler's plans to invade Czechoslovakia in autumn 1938. Göring attempted to undercut foreign policy of Hitler and Ribbentrop by sending Wiedemann to London, a policy manoeuvre that was ruined when Dirksen told Ribbentrop that Wiedemann was in London. That enraged Ribentrop, who insisted quite vehemently that foreign policy was the sole preserve of the Auswärtiges Amt and led to Wiedemann's recall.

In early August 1938, Dirksen returned to Berlin to tell Hitler personally of his belief that Britain would go to war if Germany invaded Czechoslovakia, but the Führer was not interested in the message. Hitler generally ignored Dirksen in August and September 1938, but Dirksen was in contact with several other Nazis such as Rudolf Hess and Fritz Bohle and expressed his concerns that Hitler might trigger a general war by going ahead with his plans to invade Czechoslovakia on 1 October 1938.

In September 1938, at the Nuremberg party congress, Dirksen met Hitler and told him of his fears of a general war and of his belief that the British were prepared to pressure the Czechoslovak government into ceding the Sudetenland to Germany as the price for peace. Hitler was not interested in a peaceful resolution of the Sudetenland dispute or in Dirksen's views. During the congress, Hitler, in his keynote speech on 12 September 1938, laid claim to the Sudetenland and announced if it was not allowed to return to Germany by 1 October, he would invade Czechoslovakia, which escalated the crisis and took Europe to the brink of war.

In the September 1938 crisis that led to the Munich Agreement, Dirksen played only a small role, but as a diplomat with an elegant bearing and aristocratic manners whose fluent English and polite ways charmed many in Britain, Dirksen was the respectable face of Germany in Britain in 1938. As a professional diplomat and an aristocrat, Dirksen enjoyed a good rapport with the British elite. His insistence that Hitler was wanted only to correct the "injustices" of Versailles, not to dominate Europe, impressed many of the British policymakers he met. Unlike Ribbentrop, whose arrogance and ignorance led him to commit many social gaffes, the eminently-"correct" Dirksen, with his perfect gentleman's manners, made a favourable impression in London.

Immediately after the Munich Agreement and the Anglo-German Declaration, both signed on 30 September 1938, Dirksen was told by Ribbentrop that the declaration, which committed the two nations never to go to war again, meant nothing to Hitler. However, knowing that Chamberlain attached great importance to the declaration, Dirksen was told to act as if it did.

In October 1938, in a dispatch to Berlin, Dirksen reported that the British public reaction to Hitler's Saarbrücken speech on 3 October 1938, stating that Germany would not tolerate British "interference" in the affairs of Europe, had been highly negative. Dirksen also advised Hitler to stop attacking by name two Conservative backbenchers in the House of Commons, Anthony Eden and Winston Churchill, since his speeches raised their profile in the British press. Finally, Dirksen reported that based on his meetings with members of the British cabinet that, he believed that the Chamberlain government was seeking an Anglo-German détente. Dirksen advised that Germany take up the British offer of "disarmament", which, in the 1930s. He predicted that to lead to Chamberlain offering to return to Germany its former African colonies that were now ruled by Britain. In response, Baron Ernst von Weizsäcker, the State Secretary of the Auswärtiges Amt, wrote back to Dirksen that the German media campaign hostile to British rearmament "was instigated on the direct orders of the Foreign Minister". Schorske noted that a "striking" aspect of the line of Anglo-German negotiations that Dirksen wanted to pursue in October 1938 was that reflected Chamberlain's priorities, such as disarmament and the possible return of the former German colonies in Africa, did not reflect Hitler's priorities, such as Czecho-Slovakia (the new name of Czechoslovakia since October 1938), the Memelland and Poland. In the last two weekends of October 1938, Dirksen made visits to the English countryside to meet Sir Samuel Hoare and Leslie Burgin for talks on an Anglo-German détente. Dirksen reported to the Wilhelmstrasse that both Hoare and Burgin wanted talks about an Anglo-German treaty to end the arms race; another treaty to "humanise" air war with bombing of cities and chemical weapons to be banned; a colonial settlement to return the former German colonies in Africa in exchanges for promises of no war in Europe and a British "guarantee" to protect Germany from the Soviet Union. The British historian D.C. Watt wrote: "This last is often cited by Soviet historians as proof of their thesis that the Cabinet was obsessed with the urge to provoke a German-Soviet war. Taken in its proper context, Hoare's ill-chosen remarks made it clear that the offer of a guarantee was intended to disarm any German arguments that Soviet strength in the air necessitated the maintenance of a large German Luftwaffe".

Three weeks after the Munich Agreement, which Dirksen had predicted would allow an Anglo-German détente, Weizsäcker wrote to Dirksen, "Things here are moving rapidly, but not in the direction of Anglo-German rapprochement at present". In November 1938, Dirsken complained about the Kristallnacht solely under the grounds that it damaged Germany's image in Britain but made no moral condemnation of the pogrom at all. In early December 1938, Dirksen formally announced that his government planned to use the clauses in the Anglo-Naval Agreement to build a submarine fleet equal to Britain's and would upgrade two cruisers under construction from the 6-inch guns, which they were meant to have, to having instead 8-inch guns. In December 1938, Dirksen resumed his efforts for Anglo-German détente in the hope of negotiating a series of Anglo-German economic agreements as the starting point. In December 1938, Chamberlain gave a speech at a formal dinner of the correspondents of the German News Agency in London, with Dirksen present. When Chamberlain spoke of the "futility of ambition, if ambition leads to the desire for domination", Dirksen, who interpreted that remark as an implied criticism of Hitler, led all of the assembled German journalists to walk out in protest.

In January 1939, Dirksen opened up talks with the Foreign Office for an Anglo-German coal agreement. Hitler had authorised Anglo-German economic talks in January 1939 as a smokescreen for the anti-British turn in his foreign policy. He approved the five-year Plan Z on 27 January 1939 for a gigantic fleet that was meant to crush the Royal Navy by 1944. The Z Plan called for six H-class battleships with 20-inch guns that would have been the largest battleships ever built if they had actually been constructed by dwarfing even Japan's Yamato class battleships, which were actually the largest battleships ever built, with their 18-inch guns. Building such truly colossal battleships took time and money and so required a period of Anglo-German peace. A notable contradiction existed in Hitler's strategic planning in 1939 between embarking on an anti-British foreign policy, whose major instruments were a vastly-expanded Kriegsmarine and a Luftwaffe capable of a strategic bombing offensive, which would take several years to build, and engaging in reckless short-term actions, such as attacking Poland, which were likely to cause a general war.Messerschmidt, Manfred "Foreign Policy and Preparation for War" from Germany and the Second World War Clarendon Press: Oxford, United Kingdom, 1990 pages 688–690. Ribbentrop, because of his status as the expert on Britain, resolved Hitler's dilemma by supporting the anti-British line and by repeatedly advising Hitler that Britain would not go to war for Poland in 1939.

In February 1939, Dirksen invited Sir Oliver Stanley, the president of the Board of Trade, to visit Germany for economic talks in Berlin, which was taken as a sign in London that Germany wanted better relations. Dirksen also tried to have Economics Minister Walther Funk visit London for economics talks, but it was vetoed by Ribbentrop as a threat to his turf. Dirksen told British Foreign Secretary Lord Halifax not to take the anti-British campaign personally in the German media that had been launched in November 1938 and said that it was only a negotiating tactic, not a preparation for war. Dirksen went on to say that Ribbentrop was not really an Anglophobe bur was willing to come to London personally to sign an Anglo-German nonaggression pact. In early March 1939, Dirksen visited Berlin, where Ribbentrop told him that Germany would violate the Munich Agreement later that month by occupying the Czech half of Czecho-Slovakia and that Prague would be German by the middle of the month. After his return to London on 9 March 1939, Dirksen recalled in his memoirs that he "found the same optimistic mood that had prevailed in February. Stanely's visit to Berlin was to take place soon – on March 17 – and it was obvious that the British government attached great importance to it".

Shortly afterward, Dirksen welcomed to London Gertrud Scholtz-Klink, the Frauenfuhrerin who ran the party's women's branch and had come to Britain to study "social conditions" affecting British women. Scholtz-Klink was a fanatical Nazi who was praised by Hitler as "the ideal National Socialist woman". The dinner to welcome Scholtz-Klink at the Claridge's by the Anglo-German Association attended by an impressive collection of British high-society women, including Lady Violet Astor; the Dowager Marchioness of Reading; the Conservative MP Florence Horsbrugh; the Dowager Countess of Airlie, Lady Cynthia Colville; and the presidents of the National Women's Citizens Association, the National Council of Women of Great Britain, and the National Council for Maternity and Child Welfare. Dirksen reported that the dinner had gone well and the British women had been very interested in what Scholtz-Klink had to say, but the fact that she spoke no English and needed an interpreter imposed problems. However, Scholtz-Klink's visit to London sparked protests by British feminists outside the German embassy with women carrying signs written in German reading, "Freedom for the women of Hitler's concentration camps".

On 15 and 16 March 1939, during meetings with Halifax after the German occupation of the Czech half of Czecho-Slovakia, Dirksen received warnings that Britain would go to war to resist any Germany attempt to dominate the world and that Britain might attempt a policy of "containment" after the violation of the Munich Agreement. Dirksen's meetings with Halifax were described as very "stormy", as Halifax chided him for how his government had just violated the Munich Agreement. Dirksen responded that the Treaty of Versailles was "unjust" to the Reich, Czechoslovakia had been created by Versailles and destruction of Czecho-Slovakia had been justified as Germany was just undoing the "unjust" terms of Versailles. Halifax, not impressed with that argument, told Dirksen that his government had promised in the Munich Agreement to respect the sovereignty of Czecho-Slovakia and that for him, keeping a promise was the mark of men of honour. Halifax, an aristocrat from Yorkshire, had felt a certain affinity for Dirksen, an aristocrat from Silesia and so found dishonesty from Dirksen to be especially reprehensible and told Dirksen that gentleman do not lie to each other. In his reports to Berlin, Dirksen toned down Halifax's language and remarks, especially the parts in which Halifax criticised Dirksen for not behaving like a gentleman and an aristocrat by lying to him. However, the British transcripts showed that Halifax was far more angry than what Dirksen's reports would suggest.

On 17 March 1939, Chamberlain delivered a speech in Birmingham to the Birmingham Unionist Association and said that if Germany wanted to dominate the world, Britain would go to war, rather than accept a world dominated by the Reich. In his speech, Chamberlain wondered aloud if, by occupying Prague, Germany had taken "a step in the direction to dominate the world by force". He went on to say if Germany wanted to "challenge" Britain for world domination that "no greater mistake could be made than to suppose that because it believes war to be a senseless and cruel thing, this nation has so lost its fibre that it will not take part to the utmost of its power in resisting such a challenge if it ever were made". In a long report on the Birmingham speech that he sent to Berlin on 18 March 1939, Dirksen wrote, "It would be wrong to cherish any illusions that a fundamental change has not taken place in Britain's attitude to Germany".

Dirksen took a contradictory line in the spring and summer of 1939 between his desire to see a war that would wipe Poland off the map and his fear of starting a world war that Germany might lose. Dirksen was extremely anti-Polish and had often called for the destruction of Poland and so supported Fall Weiss (Plan White), the German plan to invade Poland. Schorske wrote that Dirksen "believed firmly in the justice of Hitler's anti-Polish policy. Like most German nationalists, he held the Poles in complete contempt, a contempt fortified in his case by service in Warsaw and Danzig during his younger years". When Britain offered the "guarantee" of Poland on 31 March 1939, Dirksen protested to Halifax: "Britain, by her guarantee to Poland, placed the peace of the world in the hands of minor Polish officials and military men".

Dirksen's policy in the Danzig Crisis was one to attempting to allow Germany to attack Poland without fear of British involvement. Dirksen wanted a war against Poland in 1939 but not a war against Britain and repeated his efforts to sever Britain from Poland by trying to persuade Britain to give up its "guarantee" of Poland. In his meetings with Halifax in the spring and the summer of 1939, Dirksen often told him about "Polish adventurism and moral turpitude" and attacked the British quite violently for being so "foolish" as to make a "guarantee" of a people who, Dirksen insisted, did not at all deserve British protection. Dirksen reported to Weizsäcker that he wanted "to enlighten the English, who are unsophisticated in continental and especially East European affairs, on the nature of the Polish state, and on our claims to Danzig and the Corridor". On the British efforts to create a "peace front" to "contain" Germany, Dirksen told Halifax that all Germans were "unanimously determined to parry this danger of encirclement and not to tolerate a repetition of 1914". Despite Dirksen's attempts to argue that the Free City of Danzig, which was 90% German, should be allowed to return to the Reich, the German occupation of the Czech half of Czecho-Slovakia on 15 March 1939 meant the British were not receptive to his appeals in 1939, unlike in 1938 over the Sudetenland. As Halifax put it on 20 July 1939:

From 14 April to 16 August 1939, the German embassy in Britain received on a weekly basis anonymously mailed packages containing decrypted diplomatic cables to and from the Foreign Office to the British embassy in the Soviet Union. They were carefully edited to make it appear that Anglo-Soviet relations were far better than what there were and that the talks to have the Soviet Union join the "peace front" were going well. Dirksen was not entirely certain of the origin of packages or the precise veracity of their contents, but he passed them on along back to Berlin and said that intelligence might be useful. Two cipher clerks in the Foreign Office, John King and Ernest Oldham, had independently sold in the early 1930s the Foreign Office's codes to the NKVD, the Soviet secret police, and so the Soviets read all of the Foreign Office's cables throughout the 1930s. The mysterious packages were from the NKVD, which wanted to make it appear that an Anglo-Soviet alliance was in the offering as a way of frightening Germany to come to terms with Moscow.

On 18 May 1939, during a meeting with Halifax, Dirksen was informed that the Reich should have no illusions about Britain's willingness to go to war, and that if Germany should attack Poland, Britain would go to war. In response, an angry Dirsken told Halifax that Germany's policy had always been seeking peacefully to revise the Treaty of Versailles, Germany had no intention of invading Poland and Halifax had fallen victim to anti-German hysteria in believing otherwise. Dirksen often reported to Berlin the British efforts to built a "peace front" to be blocked by the question of including the Soviet Union. On 27 May 1939, Chamberlain told the House of Commons that the cabinet had instructed Sir William Seeds, the British ambassador to the Soviet Union, to open discussions on a military alliance. Dirken reported to the Wilhelmstrasse that Chamberlain had opened the talks with the Soviets "with the greatest reluctance" and that he was not keen on an alliance with the Soviet Union. Dirksen reported that the British had learned about the "German feelers in Moscow" and were "afraid that Germany might succeed in keeping Soviet Russia neutral or even inducing her to adopt benevolent neutrality. That would have meant the complete collapse of the encirclement action".

On 24 June 1939, Dirksen, in a dispatch, to Berlin reported that his efforts to turn the British against the "guarantee" of Poland were bearing fruit, and he stated that he believed the British government to be moving away from the "encirclement" of Germany towards a "more constructive policy". Dirksen reported on the same day that British public opinion had been caught up in anti-German "hysteria" in the spring but that he now believed that public opinion was in a "state of flux" since the full implications of war with Germany had started to be felt. As evidence, Dirksen quoted to Weizsäcker from several letters to the editor of The Times attacking the Poles for refusing to allow Danzig to return to Germany and criticizing Chamberlain for the "guarantee" of Poland, which Dirksen thought was proof that British public opinion was changing. Dirksen also wrote that "a surprise initiative on the part of Chamberlain is within the bounds of probability and it is quite possible that rumor current here, that he will approach Germany with new proposals after the completion of the negotiations with the Russians will materialize into fact in one form or another". In Dirksen's view, the proposed alliance with the Soviet Union that would form the eastern anchor of the "peace front" was merely a negotiating tactic for a Munich-type deal to resolve the Danzig Crisis, rather than to deter Germany from invading Poland.

In early July 1939, Dirksen reported to the Wilhelmstrasse that British public opinion would come to understand the "justice" of the German demand for the Free City of Danzig to be allowed to return to Germany. Dirksen wrote: "The wave of excitement will ebb as soon as it rose, as soon as the proper conditions exist. The most important condition is a quieter atmosphere in England which will permit a more unprejudiced examination of the German viewpoint. The germs of this already exist. Within the Cabinet and a small, but influential group of politicians, a desire is manifested to pass from the negativity of the encirclement front to a more constructive policy towards Germany. And however strong the counter-forces trying to stifle this tender plant may be-Chamberlain's personality is a certain guarantee that a British policy will not be placed in the hands of unscrupulous adventurers (i.e Churchill, Eden, etc)". On the British efforts to build a "peace front", Dirksen explained it to Berlin as a result of a "dual policy" by the Chamberlain government. Dirksen reported: "England wants by means of armament and the acquisition of allies to make herself strong and equal to the Axis, but at the same time she wants by means of negotiation to seek an adjustment with Germany and is prepared to make sacrifices for it: on the question of colonies, raw materials supplies, Lebensraum, and spheres of economic influence". In private, Dirksen complained that Ribbentrop's relentless Anglophobia unnecessarily inflamed Anglo-German relations by making Ribbentrop persist in presenting to Hitler every move in British foreign policy in the worse possible light. Dirksen told the Foreign Office in an "off-the-record" meeting that a high-level Englishman who was fluent in German, the only language that Hitler spoke, should visit Berlin to meet Hitler to tell him that an Anglo-German rapprochement was still possible.

On 17 July 1939, Helmuth Wohlthat, Hermann Göring's deputy in the Four-Year Plan Organisation, attended the meeting of the International Whaling Conference in London as part of the German delegation, and the next day, he and Dirksen met Sir Horace Wilson, the Chief Industrial Adviser to the Government and one of Chamberlain's closest friends. Wilson decided to talk to Wohlthat of the Four-Year Plan Organisation, rather than the Auswärtiges Amt since the latter was run by the Anglophobic Ribbentrop. Without informing Ribbentrop, Dirksen allowed the Wilson-Wohlthat meetings in London to go ahead in which Wilson offered that in an exchange for a German promise not to attack Poland and a "renunciation of aggression in principle" as a way of solving international disputes, he would agree to an Anglo-German nonaggression pact, a "delimitation of spheres of influence" in Europe and a plan for the "international governance" of Africa in which all of the European great powers would jointly administer Africa. However, Wilson clarified to Wohlthat that he regarded Germany as the source of the tension between Germany and Poland by laying claim to Danzig and that the onus was on the Reich to reduce tension with Poland, not the other way around. Halifax told Dirksen much the same thing at the same time. Dirksen and Wohlthat argued that Wilson and another British civil servant, Robert Hudson, had given them a memorandum, "Programme for German-British Cooperation", but Wilson denied having given them such a document, and Wilson's account of the meeting to the Foreign Office suggested that neither Wohlthat nor Dirksen seemed very serious, as both expected all of the concessions to come from Britain, with Germany making none.

On 20 July 1939, Hudson, of the Department of Overseas Trade, visited the German embassy to meet Dirksen and Wohlthat. Hudson, an ambitious civil servant and former Conservative MP who was addicted to intrigue, acted on his own in the hope of scoring a great success to help his otherwise-stalled career. In a somewhat-vainglorious account of his meeting at the German embassy, Hudson spoke of about having Danzig rejoin Germany if the latter promised to leave Poland alone. According to Hudson's notes, in exchange for a German promise not to invade Poland and for ending the Anglo-German arms race, a plan would have the industrialists who ran the heavy industry of Germany, Britain and the United States work together in the economic development of China, Eastern Europe and Africa; a loan in sum of hundreds of millions for Germany to be floated in the City and on Wall Street and some sort of plan for the "international governance" of Africa. He ended his account by saying that if only Hitler learned to think in economic terms, much would be possible. A preening Hudson, who believed that he had more-or-less singlehandedly saved the world from the threat of another world war by his visit to the German embassy, unwisely showed his notes recording what he had said to a group of journalists and told them "off the record" that he had just ended the crisis by his bold proposals for Anglo-German economic co-operation and that Wohlthat was definitely interested in what Hudson had to say. Hudson asked the journalists not to publish yet since his plan needed more time, but two of the journalists decided that the story was news and so decided to publish. On 22 July 1939, The Daily Telegraph and The News Chronicle broke the story on their front pages that Britain just had offered Germany a loan worth hundreds of millions of pound sterling in exchange for not attacking Poland. The public reaction to the story was highly negative, with much of the press calling Hudson's proposed loan "Danegeld". To stop Viking raids and attacks, English kings had sometimes paid "Danegeld", meaning Dane money, to bribe the Danes from attacking, and ever since, "paying the Danegeld" in England has implied weakness and cowardice that of those who would rather bribe their way out of trouble to standing up for themselves. By calling Hudson's proposed loan to Germany "Danegeld", the British newspapers effectively called Hudson a coward. Much to Hudson's humiliation, Chamberlain told the British House of Commons that no such loan was being considered and that Hudson was speaking for himself.

Based on his meetings with Wilson, Dirksen advised on 24 July 1939 to take up Wilson's offer to discuss how best to have Danzig peacefully return to Germany and said that unless the Reich made a move soon, "Churchill and the other incendiaries" in the backbenches were to be stopped, it would topple Chamberlain's government. Dirksen approved of the Wilson-Wohltat meetings, as he felt it was possible to reach an Anglo-German deal with Göring, who was much more pragmatic than Ribbentrop. Dirksen found his room to maneuver had been greatly reduced by the Hudson affair hitting the press and that it was difficult to contact Wohlthat after he returned to Germany, on 21 July 1939. It was not until late August that Dirksen finally saw the report that Wohlthat had given to Göring on his return to Berlin in late July. Dirksen had supported the Wilson-Wohlthat meetings but had managed to hide his role enough to make it appear as only a minor player to protect himself from Ribbentrop, who he knew he would disapprove of them. On 31 July 1939, Ribbentrop's message to Dirksen attacked him severely for allowing the Wilson-Wohlthat talks even to take place, said that the British had no business in talking to one of Göring's men and demanded any negotiations conducted by the British to pass by him. Dirksen managed to save himself from worse trouble only by presenting Wilson as the one who had initiated the talks, which he portrayed to Ribbentrop to be a sign of British weakness. Ribbentrop had no interest in any sort of talks to resolve the German-Polish dispute, as he wanted a war in 1939, the Danzig dispute being a mere pretext. Count Hans-Adolf von Moltke, the German ambassador to Poland, had been ordered by Ribbentrop not to conduct talks with the Poles, as it always Ribbentrop's great fear in 1939 that the Poles might actually allow the Free City of Danzig to return to Germany, and for the same reason, Ribbentrop always refused to see Józef Lipski, the Polish ambassador to Germany.

Only nine hours after Ribbentrop had attacked Dirksen for allowing the Wilson-Wohlthat talks to occur and ordered Dirksen to sabotage the talks, Weizsäcker sent Dirksen a cable asking if the British were prepared to sever their commitments to Poland and how serious the British were about having the Soviet Union join the "peace front". Dirksen, in response, sent Weizsäcker a cable stating "leading personages" in London were willing to abandon Poland if Germany promised not to take Danzig by force, and the entire strategy of the "peace front" would be disregarded if Germany was willing to take up the offers made by Wilson to Wohlthat. As for the Soviet Union joining the "peace front", Dirksen reported: "The continuation of negotiations for a pact with Russia, in spite of – or rather, just because of – the dispatch of a military mission is regarded here with skepticism. This is borne out by the composition of the British military mission: the admiral, until now the Commandant of Portsmouth, is practically in retirement, and was never on the staff of the Admiralty; the general is likewise purely a combat officer; the air general is an outstanding aviator and air instructor, but not a strategist. This indicates the value of the military mission is more to ascertain the fighting value of the Soviet Army rather than to make operational arrangements.... The Wehrmacht attachés are agreed in observing a surprising skepticism in British military circles about the forthcoming talks with the Soviet armed forces".Shirer, William The Rise and Fall of the Third Reich, New York: Viking, 1960 page 503. Dirksen also noted the British military mission to the Soviet Union, which was headed by Admiral Sir Reginald Aylmer Ranfurly Plunkett-Ernle-Erle-Drax, was taking a ship, the City of Exeter, which not noted for its speed, which Dirksen used to argue that the British were not really serious about having the Soviet Union join the "peace front". Dirksen believed that the report would win Hitler to a plan that would "chemically dissolve the Danzig problem" and not seek war, but instead, Ribbentrop used Dirksen's report to argue to Hitler that the British were cowards who were unwilling to go war for Poland, as was proven by Dirksen's statement that the British were not really interested in having the Soviet Union join the "peace front".

On 3 August 1939, Dirksen had his final meeting with Wilson. The accounts left by Dirksen and Wilson of the meeting are so different that they are impossible to reconcile. Wilson's account has him insisting that Germany had to take the initiative to end the Danzig crisis and with Wilson pressing Dirksen on why Hitler was not acting on the back channel that he opened to try to end the crisis. Dirksen, by contrast, portrayed Wilson as being desperate for any sort of concession and reproduced Wilson's warnings of war as an expression of British fear of German might. The Canadian historian Michael Jabara Carley summarised the differences between the German and British accounts of the Wilson-Dirksen meeting: "According to Wilson, Dirksen proposed an agenda of items that would interest Hitler, according to Dirksen, Wilson confirmed what he had suggested to Wohlthat, including a non-aggression pact and trade negotiations". Most notably, Dirksen has Wilson saying that the proposed Anglo-German non-aggression pact would end the "guarantee" to Poland and the negotiations with the Soviet Union, with the clear implication that Germany would have all of Eastern Europe, in exchange for leaving the British Empire alone. Dirksen also has Wilson saying that the negotiations must be kept secret, as any leak would anger the British people and might even bring down the Chamberlain government, and that Wilson wanted the Anglo-German talks to be held in secret in Switzerland, a statement that does not appear in Wilson's notes of the meeting.Shore, Zachery What Hitler Knew: The Battle for Information in Nazi Foreign Policy, Oxford: Oxford University Press, 2005 page 95 Historians have greatly differed over the version of the Wilson-Dirksen meeting that is correct. The American historian Zachery Shore argued that Dirksen had no reason to fabricate such an offer from Wilson, and Chamberlain, was in fact, seeking to begin secret negotiations for an Anglo-German non-aggression pact in Switzerland that would have seen Britain abandon Poland. By contrast, the British historian D.C. Watt has argued for the veracity of Wilson's notes by arguing that there is no evidence on the British seeking such a pact, which, if signed, would have probably brought down the Chamberlain government.

At times, Dirksen reported in his dispatches to Ribbentrop that British public opinion was tired of appeasement and that Britain would go to war if Germany attacked Poland. However, Dirksen noted that the British "guarantee" of Poland issued on 31 March 1939 was only of the independence of Poland, not of its borders, and he believed, based on contacts with British politicians, that another Munich-style deal was possible for the Free City of Danzig to return to Germany. At other times, Dirksen reported to Berlin that Britain would not honour the Anglo-Polish military alliance, and would back down if Germany invaded Poland. In August 1939, Dirksen reported that Chamberlain knew "the social structure of Britain, even the conception of the British Empire, would not survive the chaos of even a victorious war" and so he would abandon his commitments to Poland. Dirksen's messages on Britain's unwillingness to go to war to defend Poland had the effect of convincing Hitler that any German attack on Poland would result only in a German–Polish War, not a world war.

To prevent any British offer that might stop the war, Ribbentrop ordered for none of his ambassadors in London, Paris and Warsaw to be at their posts. On 14 August 1939, Dirksen arrived in Berlin to take a vacation in Germany and was told by Weizsäcker that he was under no condition to return to London. At the same time, Weizsäcker also informed Count Johannes von Welczeck, the German ambassador to France, and Count Hans-Adolf von Moltke, the German ambassador to Poland, who had also been ordered to take a vacation in Germany, that neither men were to return to their posts. Dirksen, in turn, mentioned that to Baron Bernardo Attolico, the Italian ambassador to Germany, to say it was going to be war for certain in the summer and observed that if his country wanted a peaceful resolution of the Danzig Crisis, the ambassadors to Britain, France and Poland would have been ordered to return to their embassies. Attolico reported that to Rome, and as the Germans had broken the Italian diplomatic codes, Dirksen was summoned to the Wilhelmstrasse by Ribbentrop to be screamed at and berated for his incompetence and to be told that he was now excluded from all political discussions as a security risk. When Germany invaded Poland on 1 September 1939, that was followed by a British declaration of war on Germany on 3 September, an effect of which was the ruin of Dirksen's diplomatic career, and he never held a major post again.

 World War II 

Dirksen spent most of the war at Gröditzberg and his estate in Silesia at Gröditz (now Grodziec, Poland). As a leading expert on the subject, Dirksen often gave talks on the Soviet Union at various locales throughout Europe, such as to Wehrmacht generals, most notably Field Marshal Erich von Manstein, who visited Gröditzberg to ask Dirksen for advice. As many of the farm labourers who worked Dirksen's estate were called up for service with the Wehrmacht, Dirksen used slave labour from Poland as replacement workers to tend to the sugar beet fields on his estate. In 1943, Dirksen published a picture book, Freundesland im Osten ein Nipponbuch in Bildern, containing a collection of photographs of daily Japanese life that he had taken during his time as ambassador in Japan.

In February 1945, Gröditzberg was taken by the Red Army. Dirksen chose to stay in the belief that he could serve as a mediator between the Soviet Union and Germany. The Red Army plundered the castle but became more respectful when Dirksen showed them a photograph taken in the early 1930s of himself and the Defense Commissar, Marshal Kliment Voroshilov. Voroshilov was unique under Stalin as being the only member of the Soviet Politburo allowed to have a personality cult of his own. Ribbentrop believed that Dirksen would betray secrets to the Soviets and ordered him to be taken back. An Abwehr team was infiltrated into Gröditzberg and arrived at the castle to tell Dirksen that he was coming, regardless of what he might think. On a cold February night, Dirksen and the Abwehr team walked through the frozen fields back to the German lines. Dirksen left behind his private papers at the castle, which were captured by the Red Army. In 1948, the Narkomindel published a very-selective version of Dirksen's papers dealing with his time as ambassador in London to support the official Soviet historical line that British appeasement had been aimed at causing a German-Soviet war to save British capitalism, thus justifying the 1939 German-Soviet Pact to thwart the alleged British scheme.

Later life
In 1947, Dirksen was cleared by a denazification court, which declared him not have been an active party member. In 1950, Dirksen published his memoirs, Moskau, Tokyo, London, recounting his career as a diplomat in the Soviet Union, Japan and the United Kingdom. He stated quite flatly that he was not ashamed that he had joined the Nazi Party in 1936, as the regime had achieved "impressive" political and economic changes in Germany.

In a review of the book, the American historian Fritz Epstein noted that there were significant differences between the book's German original, published in 1950, and the English version, published in 1952. One is that the section dealing with Dirksen's time as a diplomat in the Netherlands in 1917 had been reduced from three pages to six lines. Also, his time as a diplomat in Kiev dealing with the puppet regime of Hetman Pavlo Skoropadskyi had six pages in the German original but three pages in the English edition.

In another review, the Canadian scholar Frank Tresnak asked about the differences between Germany's traditional elite and the Nazi elite. He answered, "If were we are to judge by this book, there seems to have been precious little".

Tresnak continued, "From 1919 onward, the common aim of almost all Germans was to achieve the abolition of the Versailles diktat–a treaty which just or unjust, was an adequate expression of the German defeat of 1918, after a war which Germany herself started". Tresnak wrote that Dirksen's memoirs showed that he, in all essentials, fully agreed with Hitler's plans to destroy the international order that had been established by the Treaty of Versailles and to have Germany become the world's strongest power. They differed only on the precise strategy and tactics to be employed. Tresnak ended his review by remarking, "He has tears aplenty for torn and defeated Germany, but not a word of sympathy for the millions of murdered Jews, Poles, Yugoslavs, Czechs, and the rest.... After reading Herr von Dirksen's book, one cannot help feeling that he, and perhaps other Germans as well, condemn Hitler chiefly on the grounds that he did not win the war–though sometimes they act as they are not aware that he lost it".

In a review, the American political scientist Joseph Schectman noted that Dirksen expressed much anger in his memoirs about the expulsions of Germans from Eastern Europe but failed once to mention that Germany had killed about 1,500,000 Poles and 6,000,000 Jews during the war. Schectman noted Dirksen's seemed to say that only the lives of Germans matter, not the lives of Poles and Jews.

Baron Tilo von Wilmowsky, the husband of Barbara von Krupp and a senior executive at the firm of Krupp AG, which was Germany's biggest corporation, had become involved in a campaign to "clear the rubble" cast against German big business. Wilmowsky's preferred instrument was Henry Regnery, a conservative Germanophile American publisher based in Chicago that specialised in publishing books that sought to deny that Germany's traditional elites were anyway involved with Nazi crimes and portrayed Allied policies towards Germany both during and after World War II as cruel and unjust. It published such conservative classics like God and Man at Yale by William F. Buckley and The Conservative Mind by Russell Kirk and it also published strongly-antiwar books such as Politics, Trials and Errors by Royal Marine General Maurice Hankey. They vigorously denounced the war crimes trials and argued for the innocence of all German and Japanese leaders convicted of war crimes. Also, it published Victor's Justice, by Montgomery Belgion, which condemned the Allied policies of bringing Nazi war criminals to justice as cruel and barbaric, and The High Cost of Vengeance, by Freda Utley, which argued that the Allied policies towards Germany had been criminal and inhumane.

In 1950, Wilmoswky used Dirksen, Heinrich Brüning, Franz von Papen and Belgion as his major advisers on the latest book that Regnery was going to publish, which was intended to deny that industrialists like him had supported the Nazi regime and used slave labour during World War II. The industrialist Baron Alfried Krupp von Bohlen und Halbach, who had effectively ran Krupp AG during World War II, had been convicted by an American court of using slave labour, and Wilmowsky wanted to rebut that charge. In a letter, Dirksen advised Wilmowsky that it would "psychologically better" if the book was presented as a "neutral investigation of industrialists in the total state and total war" that compared both industrial mobilisation in the Allies and the Axis, rather than focusing on the actions of German industrialists. Dirksen argued that if the mobiliaation of industrialists by the state wartime were to be presented as a universal trend, the specific acts by German industrialists, like using slave labour, could be explained away as part of a universal tendency. Dirksen felt such a book would be useful in ending the "Nuremberg complex" held against Germany and argued that it was time that people stop holding Nazi crimes against Germany.

Belgion wrote to Dirksen: "My own feeling is that such a book... would not appeal to the general public unless it could be cast in the form of a dramatic story and that would require on the part of the author a rare combination of gifts—an understanding of the problems of large-scale business and also an ability to give the exposition of them a magic touch. I do not myself know of any English or American author who possesses that combination".

After much searching for an author, Wilmowsky's book was finally published by Regnery in 1954 as Tycoons and the Tyrant: German industry from Hitler to Adenauer by Louis P. Lochner, which portrayed German industrialists as victims of Hitler and argued it was not their fault that they ended up using slave labour in their factories.

Dirksen was active in the 1950s in groups that represented Germans expelled from Silesia and rejected the Oder–Neisse line as Germany's eastern frontier. In 1954, Dirksen called a press conference to criticize Chancellor Konrad Adenauer's policy of western integration. He instead argued that West Germany should try to play off the Western powers against the Soviet Union to achieve German reunification.

 References 

 Sources 
Dirksen, Herbert von, Moscow, Tokyo, London: Twenty Years of German Foreign Policy, Norman, OK: University of Oklahoma Press, 1952.
Snyder, Louis, Encyclopedia of the Third Reich, New York: McGraw-Hill, 1976.
Schorske, Carl "Two German Ambassadors: Dirksen and Schulenburg", pages 477-511 from The Diplomats 1919–1939 edited by Gordon A. Craig and Felix Gilbert, Princeton, New Jersey: Princeton University Press, 1953.K
Mund, Gerald, Herbert von Dirksen (1882–1955). Ein deutscher Diplomat in Kaiserreich, Weimarer Republik und Drittem Reich. Eine Biografie. Berlin: dissertation.de – Verlag im Internet, 2003.
Mund, Gerald: Ostasien im Spiegel der deutschen Diplomatie. Die privatdienstliche Korrespondenz des Diplomaten Herbert von Dirksen von 1933 bis 1938.'' Steiner Verlag, Stuttgart, 2006 (= Historische Mitteilungen der Ranke-Gesellschaft, Beiheft 63).

External links 
Dirksen in London on his way to present his credentials to King George IV, 3 May 1938
Herbert von Dirksen. Ostatni pan na zamku Grodziec Przed wojną był niemieckim dyplomatą w Moskwie, Tokio i Londynie. A po 1939 roku uprawiał buraki w Grodźcu na Dolnym Śląsku-Grodziec Castle at Dirksen's estate in Silesia, in Polish.
 

1882 births
1955 deaths
Politicians from Berlin
German National People's Party politicians
Nazi Party politicians
German untitled nobility
Ambassadors of Germany to the Soviet Union
Ambassadors of Germany to the United Kingdom
Ambassadors of Germany to Japan
German Army personnel of World War I
Recipients of the Iron Cross (1914)